The Australian National Audit Office (ANAO) is the supreme audit institution of Australia, functioning as the national auditor for the Parliament of Australia and Government of Australia. It reports directly to the Australian Parliament via the Speaker of the House of Representatives and the President of the Senate. Administratively, the ANAO is located in the Prime Minister and Cabinet portfolio.

The current Auditor-General of Australia is Grant Hehir, who was appointed in June 2015 for a 10-year term.

Role 

The Australian National Audit Office is a specialist public sector agency that supports the Auditor-General of Australia, who is an independent officer of the Parliament of Australia. The Auditor-General may report its findings directly to Parliament or to a Minister, on any important matter.

In addition, the ANAO plays a leadership role in improving public administration and audit capability in Australia and overseas by publishing information such as better practice guides and deploying experienced staff to audit institutions in Indonesia and Papua New Guinea.

Auditor-General 

The Auditor-General is appointed by the Governor-General on the recommendation of the Minister, for a term of ten years.

The current Auditor-General is Grant Hehir, who was appointed on 11 June 2015.

Below is a full list of Commonwealth Auditors-General dating from 1902.

History 
The Audit Act 1901 was the fourth piece of legislation passed by the Parliament. The Audit Act provided a legislative basis for the financial management of Commonwealth finances and the audit of related accounts, it also provided a legal foundation for the appointment of an Auditor-General. The first Auditor-General, John William Israel, began establishing the Federal Audit Office in 1902 in Melbourne. The office moved to Canberra in 1935, in line with Government policy at that time.

The Audit Act 1901 was amended in 1979 to allow the Audit Office to undertake performance audits ("efficiency reviews"). Efficiency reviews, or performance audit, concerns the efficiency and effectiveness of a particular government activity.

The Audit Act 1901 was replaced with the Auditor-General Act 1997, which came into effect on 1 January 1998. The main features of the new act included:
 provisions that strengthened the independence of the Auditor-General and the Australian National Audit Office;
 the strengthening of the Auditor-General's role as an external auditor of Commonwealth agencies, authorities, companies and their subsidiaries, including a comprehensive mandate to conduct, with some limited exceptions, financial statement and performance audits of all government entities; and
 clarification of the Auditor-General's mandate and powers.

In 1986 the ANAO hosted XII INCOSAI, the twelfth triennial convention of the International Organization of Supreme Audit Institutions.

References

External links
Australian National Audit Office
Latest Publications

Auditing organizations
Commonwealth Government agencies of Australia
Government audit
Parliament of Australia
Supreme audit institutions